, formally identified as , is a Buddhist temple in northern Kyoto, first founded in 1382 by Ashikaga Yoshimitsu, with the existing temple complex having undergone several periods of extensive reconstruction and rebuilding in the succeeding eras.

History
Shōkoku-ji was founded in the middle Muromachi period.  Initial construction of the central temple structures was begun in 1383, and the entire temple complex was initially dedicated in 1392. In the eighth month of the third year of Meitoku, Yoshimitsu organized a great banquet attended by all the great officers of the Imperial court and the military leaders of that time.  The pomp and ceremony of the affair was said to have equaled an Imperial event.

In 1383, the Zen master  (1311–1388) was designated by Yoshimitsu as founding abbot, however, Myōha insisted that the official honor be posthumously accorded to his own teacher, Musō Soseki.  The formal decision to grant this posthumous honor was proclaimed in 1385.

The entire temple complex was destroyed by fire in 1394; but reconstruction financed by Yoshimitsu followed soon after. The temple complex has been rebuilt many times over the centuries, notably during the Onin War.

After the Muromachi period, Shōkoku-ji was supported by several national leaders such as Toyotomi Hideyoshi, his son Toyotomi Hideyori, and Tokugawa Ieyasu, all of whom helped finance the temple’s various reconstruction projects. 
 Hideyori financed the 1605 reconstruction of the Hattō (Dharma Hall); and this structure, designated as an Important Cultural Property, is presently the oldest building of its type in Japan.
 Ieyasu donated the Sanmon (Mountain Gate) in 1609.
 Emperor Go-Mizunoo donated an imperial palace building to serve as the Kaisando  (Founder’s Hall).
Other buildings were reconstructed during this period, but, with the notable exception of the 17th-century hatto, the temple complex was largely devastated during the conflagration of 1788. Some structures, including the Hojo and the Kuri, were later rebuilt in the 19th century.

Dragon 

The Hattō hall  (法堂) has on its slightly domed ceiling a large painting of a dragon. The painting was done by Kanō Mitsunobu (1565–1608). The dragon symbolises the rain of Buddhist teachings. When clapping the hands together, the sound reverberates between the slightly domed ceiling and the paved stone floor, echoing throughout the hall as if it was the thunder of the dragon.

The main hall of Kennin-ji in Kyoto also has a large dragon on its ceiling.

Buddhist center
Shōkoku-ji is considered to be one of the so-called Kyoto Gozan or "five great Zen temples of Kyoto". It was ranked the second of the Kyoto during the medieval period.  For a short time in 1392, Shōkoku-ji was considered first amongst the Gozan.

Shōkoku-ji is one of fourteen autonomous branches of the Rinzai school of Japanese Zen.

The Jotenkaku Museum is located in the premises of the temple.

See also
List of National Treasures of Japan (crafts-others)
List of National Treasures of Japan (writings)
Itō Jakuchū
 Hōkō-ji, today a sub-temple
 List of Buddhist temples in Kyoto
 List of tallest structures built before the 20th century
 For an explanation of terms concerning Japanese Buddhism, Buddhist art, and Buddhist temple architecture, see the Glossary of Japanese Buddhism.

Notes

References
 Baroni, Helen Josephine. (2002).  The Illustrated Encyclopedia of Zen Buddhism. New York: Rosen Publishing Group. ;  OCLC 42680558
 Dumoulin, Heinrich. (2005)   Zen Buddhism: a History. Bloomington, Indiana: World Wisdom.  (paper)
 Ponsonby-Fane, Richard Arthur Brabazon. (1956). Kyoto: The Old Capital of Japan, 794-1869. Kyoto: The Ponsonby Memorial Society.
 Titsingh, Isaac, ed. (1834). [Siyun-sai Rin-siyo/Hayashi Gahō, 1652], Nipon o daï itsi ran; ou,  Annales des empereurs du Japon.  Paris: Oriental Translation Fund of Great Britain and Ireland.
 Snyder, Gary. (1969).   Earth House Hold: Technical Notes & Queries to Fellow Dharma Revolutionaries. New York :New Directions Publishing. ;

External links

 Shōkoku-ji official web site
  Kyoto Prefectural Tourism Guide:  Shōkoku-ji
  Joint Council for Japanese Rinzai and Obaku Zen:  Shōkoku-ji

1382 establishments in Asia
Buddhist temples in Kyoto
 
Shokoku-ji temples
Important Cultural Properties of Japan
1380s establishments in Japan